Ruslan Serhiyovych Yefanov (born 5 May 1996) is a Ukrainian professional footballer who plays as a goalkeeper for Ukrainian club Alians Lypova Dolyna.

References

External links
 Profile on Alians Lypova Dolyna official website
 
 

1996 births
Living people
Sportspeople from Makiivka
Ukrainian footballers
Association football goalkeepers
FC Shakhtar Donetsk players
FC Shakhtar-3 Donetsk players
FC Alians Lypova Dolyna players
Ukrainian First League players
Ukrainian Second League players